Hawick Lau Hoi-wai (born 13 October 1974) is a Chinese actor and singer from Hong Kong. He was named as one of the "Five Fresh Tigers of TVB" and is best known for his performances in the series A Kindred Spirit (1995), Virtues of Harmony (2001) and My Family (2005).

He then expanded his career into mainland China, acting in several notable series. His notable appearances include Sealed with a Kiss (2011), A Clear Midsummer Night (2013), The Wife's Secret (2014), Lady & Liar (2015) and Chronicle of Life (2016).

Early life
Lau grew up in Hong Kong. He is the son of the Hong Kong actor Lau Dan and his wife Lee Fuk-ying. Lau studied architecture at Ryerson University in Toronto, Ontario, Canada.

Career
Lau debuted in the 1995 drama A Kindred Spirit. He starred alongside his father Lau Dan, coincidentally portraying father and son. The same year, he signed on with Hong Kong's Sony Music as a singer.

In 1997, he released his first Chinese album LALA I Love You. In 1998, he released his first Cantonese album A Boy's Story.

Lau continued acting in Hong Kong dramas and started to gain fame locally. In 2000, he starred in the youth romance drama Aiming High with Nicholas Tse. He also had a supporting role in the financial thriller At the Threshold of an Era. From 2001 to 2002, he starred in the historical sitcom Virtues of Harmony with his father and later its sequel Virtues of Harmony II in 2003. In January 2005, he starred in modern comedy drama My Family, in his first leading role.

TVB named him as one of the 5 Fresh Tigers – a group of promising young actors that the network pushed to become stars.

In 2005, after having a significant amount of success at TVB, he left the company and traveled to mainland China, Taiwan and Singapore, where he participated in some productions. He filmed his first Mainland production The Hui Merchants of Qing (which aired in 2007). He also starred in the Mediacorp production Destiny; following which he participated in the Taiwanese drama Letter 1949.

In April 2006, Lau signed with ATV, the other main television station and production studio in Hong Kong for one year. In November 2006, Lau's first series with ATV, No Turning Back began airing.

In order to fully immerse himself into the Chinese market, Lau insisted on speaking Mandarin Chinese instead of Cantonese for his media appearances. He started to gain attention from the Chinese audiences for his appearance in the 2008 drama Royal Embroidery Workshop, which also starred Li Xiaoran.

In 2009, he starred in the republican drama Niang Qi, which won him the Best Actor Award at the Jiangsu TV Drama Awards.

In 2011, Lau gained mainstream popularity after starring in the romance melodrama Sealed With a Kiss, gaining recognition from his portrayal of Mo Shaoqian, who was likened to the Asian version of Christian Grey. Lau also starred alongside Wallace Chung in drama Under The Bodhi Tree.

In 2012, Lau starred in the romantic comedy film Holding Love alongside Yang Mi. The movie was released on the day of Qixi Festival, also known as Chinese Valentine’s Day, and topped the box office charts. He again worked with Yang in the period epic drama Ru Yi, which gained attention prior to its premiere due to his and Yang's public relationship at that time.

Lau then established his personal studio, and took on the role of a producer for the first time in the contemporary romance drama A Clear Midsummer Night. The drama aired in 2013 and quickly became popular with the audience, becoming the first drama in 2013 to surpass 100 million views. In April, he starred in the television adaptation of the 2012 hit movie Painted Skin: The Resurrection. His performance in the series won him the Best Actor in the Ancient Drama genre at the 13th Huading Awards. He then returned to TVB, filming the Hong Kong-China joint production Master of Destiny, which aired in 2015.

In 2014, he starred opposite Zhao Liying in the romance drama The Wife's Secret.

In 2015, Lau paired up with Tiffany Tang in the period romance drama Lady & Liar, which broke records to become the most viewed republic era period drama online. His character Bai Zhengqing was popular with the audience, and gained him a large number of fans. Following Lady & Liar, Lau then starred in another period drama The Cage of Love, written by famed writer Tong Hua. Lau also Co-starred with Wang Likun in Twice Bloom the Flower that year.

In 2016, Lau starred in period romance drama Chronicle of Life, portraying Kangxi Emperor. The series gained popularity upon its premiere, placing #1 in ratings nationally and topping online views. In April, the second production by Lau's studio, entitled Road to the North premiered on CNTV. He then starred in the television adaptation of Gu Long's novel The Legend of Flying Daggers.

In 2017, Lau starred in the family drama, Full Love and the legal drama Heirs.

In 2018, Lau took the lead role in the fantasy wuxia drama The Legend of Jade Sword.

In October 2019, it was confirmed that Lau's contract with Jaywalk Studio had expired and he did not renew.

In 2020, Lau starred with Chen Duling in The Invisible Life a modern drama about women struggle in work place.

Personal life
Lau announced his relationship with Chinese actress Yang Mi on January 8, 2012 through Weibo. The two had previously co-starred in Ru Yi, Holding Love and A Clear Midsummer Night.

On January 8, 2014, Lau and Yang got married in Bali, Indonesia. On June 1, 2014, Yang gave birth to their daughter nicknamed Little Sticky Rice in Hong Kong.

On December 22, 2018, Hawick Lau and Yang Mi issued a joint-statement announcing their divorce through their agency.

Filmography

Film

Television series

Variety and reality show

Awards and nominations

References

External links
 Hawick Lau Weibo
 

1974 births
Living people
Hong Kong male film actors
Hong Kong male singers
Hong Kong male television actors
Toronto Metropolitan University alumni
TVB actors
Hong Kong people of Shandong descent
20th-century Hong Kong male actors
21st-century Hong Kong male actors
Jay Walk Studio